The Caribbean Cup was the championship tournament for national association football teams that are members of the Caribbean Football Union. The first competition, established by Shell and run by former England Cricket fast bowler Fred Rumsey, was contested in 1989 in Barbados. The Caribbean Cup served as a qualification tournament among CFU members for the CONCACAF Gold Cup. The Caribbean Cup replaced the CFU Championship competition which was active between 1978 and 1988.

Trinidad and Tobago, eight-time winners, and Jamaica, six-time winners, were the most successful sides, winning a combined 14 of 18 titles. Martinique, Haiti, Cuba and Curaçao also won the tournament.

In 1990 on the day of the final, an insurrection in Trinidad and Tobago, the host nation, by the Jamaat al Muslimeen forced an abandonment of the tournament with only the final and 3rd place play-off game remaining. Also, the tournament was not held in 2000, 2002 and 2003.

The 2017 edition of the tournament was the 19th and final. The tournament was discontinued in favour of participation in the CONCACAF Nations League.

Sponsors

Over the years, the tournament has been named after its respective sponsors. Shell had sponsored the competition since its inception in 1989.

By February 1996, Jack Warner had announced a new sponsorship from sports apparel company Umbro for the 1996 Caribbean Cup. The tournament was also co-sponsored by Umbro in 1997 before Shell re-attained sole-sponsorship for the 1998 event.

In October 1998, during the first and only year of sponsorship from the Asia Sport Group (now World Sport Group), the competition changed its name to Copa Caribe. CFU's chairman Jack Warner stated that the change was made to highlight the competition being a branch of the Copa de Oro. Florida-based Inter/Forever (now Traffic Group) agreed a sponsorship deal to replace the Asia Sport Group agreement in January 1999. The competition retained the title Copa Caribe for the 1999 and 2001 editions.

There was no competition held in 2003, instead teams focused on a group-stage only qualifying tournament.

Caribbean-based mobile phone company Digicel took over the sponsorship in 2004, in June 2007 they agreed to sponsor the 2008 and 2010 events. The 2012 and 2014 editions of the competition had no title sponsor, while the last tournament (in 2017) was sponsored by Scotiabank.

Tournaments

Cumulative results 
The following is a compiled national level championship table for the CFU region. Years in italics indicate that a nation was the host or co-host.

 1 includes results representing Netherlands Antilles

Awards

Notes

See also 
 North, Central American and Caribbean nations at the FIFA World Cup

References

External links 
 Caribbean Football Union
 RSSSF archive
  

 
CONCACAF Gold Cup qualification
International association football competitions in the Caribbean
Defunct international association football competitions in North America
Recurring sporting events established in 1989
Recurring events disestablished in 2017
1989 establishments in North America
2017 disestablishments in North America